Brotherhood or The Brotherhood may refer to:

Family, relationships, and organizations 
 Fraternity (philosophy) or brotherhood,  an ethical relationship between people, which is based on love and solidarity
 Fraternity or brotherhood, a male social organization
 Brother, a male sibling
 Brother (Christian), the title used for a monk in certain monastic orders
 Lay brother, a monk primarily focused on secular work rather than prayer and worship
 Orthodox brotherhood, also Bratstva, members of an urban Eastern Orthodox community in the Polish–Lithuanian Commonwealth
 Brotherhood (Order of the Arrow), a membership level in the Boy Scouts of America honor society
 The Brotherhood, a video game company whose publications include the 2015 horror adventure game Stasis

Film 
 The Brotherhood (1968 film), an American crime drama directed by Martin Ritt, starring Kirk Douglas
 The Brotherhood (2001 film), a homoerotic horror film by David Decoteau, the first in a series
 The Brotherhood (2017 film), a 2017 Indian documentary film
 The Brotherhood (film series), a series of homoerotic horror films
 Brotherhood, a 1986 film directed by Stephen Shin
 Brotherhood: Taegukgi, a 2004 South Korean film
 Brotherhood (2009 film), a Danish drama
 Brotherhood (2010 film), an American thriller directed by Will Canon
 Brotherhood (2016 film), a British drama film and third and final installment to Noel Clarke's Kidulthood Trilogy
 Brotherhood (2018 film), a Canadian short film directed by Meryam Joobeur
 Brotherhood (2019 film), a Canadian drama film directed by Richard Bell
 Brotherhood (2022 film), a Nigerian film directed by Loukman Ali

Music 
 Brotherhood (3T album), 1995
 Brotherhood (B'z album), 1999
 Brotherhood (The Chemical Brothers album), 2008
 Brotherhood (The Doobie Brothers album), 1991
 Brotherhood (New Order album), 1986
 The Brotherhood (Lynch Mob album), 2017
 The Brotherhood (Running Wild album), 2002
 The Brotherhood (rap group), a 1990s British hip hop group

Television 
Brotherhood (2002 TV series), a 2002 Singaporean-Chinese drama series
 Brotherhood (American TV series), a 2006–2008 American crime drama series
 Brotherhood (British TV series), a 2015 British sitcom
Brotherhood (Brazilian TV series), a 2019 Brazilian crime drama web television series
"Brotherhood" (Arrow), an episode of Arrow
"Brotherhood" (Person of Interest), an episode of Person of Interest
"The Brotherhood" (Stargate Atlantis), an episode of Stargate Atlantis
Fullmetal Alchemist: Brotherhood, the second anime version of the manga Fullmetal Alchemist
The Love School, a 1975 British series also known as The Brotherhood
 Brotherhood: Final Fantasy XV, an original net animation series supplementing Final Fantasy XV

Fiction 
 The Brotherhood (comics), a Marvel series featuring a version of the Brotherhood of Mutants
 The Brotherhood, an organization based on the Communist party in Ralph Ellison's novel Invisible Man
 The Brotherhood (Nineteen Eighty-Four), a fictitious organization in George Orwell's novel Nineteen-Eighty Four
Star Wars: Brotherhood, a 2022 novel by Mike Chen

Video games 
 Assassin's Creed: Brotherhood, a 2010 video game
 The Brotherhood, a fictional gang in the 2008 video game Saints Row 2

Other uses 
 The Brotherhood, a professional wrestling tag team composed of Cody and Dustin Rhodes
 Brotherhood (Ukrainian political party), a Ukrainian national Christian anarchist political party
 The Brotherhood, a 1984 expose of Freemasonry by Stephen Knight
 The Brotherhood, an alternative name for the Brodhull, an assembly for representatives of the Cinque Ports, a historic confederation of towns in England

See also 
 Brother (disambiguation)
 Brothers (disambiguation)
 Ahva (disambiguation) (lit. Brotherhood), for Israel-related articles
  (English: The Brotherhood), a Swedish prison gang
 Sodality, a type of religious organization
 
 Brothers in Arms (disambiguation)
 Fraternity (disambiguation)
 Sisterhood (disambiguation)